The Boston Store is a historic two-story building in Chandler, Oklahoma. It was built in 1900 with rusticated sandstone. Over the years, it housed a jewelry store, an insurance brokerage firm, a tailor's, a billiards area, a drugstore, and later a restaurant. It has been listed on the National Register of Historic Places since April 5, 1984.

References

	
National Register of Historic Places in Lincoln County, Oklahoma
Commercial buildings completed in 1900
1900 establishments in Oklahoma Territory
Commercial buildings on the National Register of Historic Places in Oklahoma
Chandler, Oklahoma